Theodore Hartman Just (23 April 1886 – 13 February 1937) was a British athlete. He competed at the 1908 Summer Olympics in London.

In the 800 metres, Just won his first round heat easily with a time of 1:57.8. He then placed fifth in the final with a time of 1:56.4.

He was also a member of the British relay team. He ran the 800 metres in the medley relay competition, but his team was eliminated in the first round.

References

Sources
 
 
 

1886 births
1937 deaths
Athletes (track and field) at the 1908 Summer Olympics
Olympic athletes of Great Britain
British male middle-distance runners